Sarah Anne Munby (born 1982) is a British civil servant who has served as the Permanent Secretary of the Department for Science, Innovation and Technology since February 2023. She was previously the Permanent Secretary of the Department for Business, Energy and Industrial Strategy from July 2020 to February 2023.

Early life 
Munby was born in May 1982. As a schoolgirl, she was a member of the runner-up team in the 2000 World Schools Debating Championships held in Pittsburgh, USA.

Career 
Munby started her career working as a civil servant at the Department for Environment, Food and Rural Affairs, as an economist. She later worked for the management consultancy McKinsey & Company for fifteen years, where she "led the company's strategy and corporate finance practice in the UK and Ireland". She joined the Department for Business, Energy and Industrial Strategy (BEIS) in July 2019 as director general for business sectors. The permanent secretary at BEIS, Alex Chisholm, became chief operating officer of the civil service in April 2020. Munby replaced Sam Beckett, who served as acting permanent secretary at BEIS, as permanent secretary in July 2020.

In February 2023, Munby's department was split into three and she became Permanent Secretary of the newly-established Department for Science, Innovation and Technology.

Notes

References 

Living people
1982 births
McKinsey & Company people
British Permanent Secretaries
21st-century British civil servants
Women civil servants